Sima or SIMA may refer to:

People
 Sima (Chinese surname)
 Sima (Persian given name), a Persian feminine name in use in Iran and Turkey
 Sima (Indian given name), an Indian feminine name used in South Asia
 Sima (surname)

Places
 Sima, Comoros, on the island of Anjouan, near Madagascar
 Sima de los Huesos, a cavern in Spain, major site of ancient hominin fossils, known as Sima hominins
 Sima, Hungary
 Sima, Jinxiang County, town in Jinxiang County, Shandong, China
 Sima, Nepal, in the Jajarkot District of Nepal
 Sima (river), a river Hordaland, Norway
 Sima, Tibet, village in the north of the Tibet Autonomous Region, China
 Sima, Spanish for sinkhole or pit cave, found in several placenames
 Sima de las Cotorras, Chiapas, Mexico

Others
 Independent Union of Maritime and Related Workers (SIMA), in Angola
 Sima (architecture), the upturned edge of a classical roof
 SIMA, a shipbuilding and maritime services company in Peru
 Sima (geology), the lower part of Earth's crust
 Sima Hydroelectric Power Station, Eidfjord, Vestland, Norway
 Sima (mead), a mead from Finland
 Sima (office), the Chinese title roughly equivalent to "field marshal"
 Sima or bai sema, the ritual boundary around a Buddhist ordination hall
 Sima (Swahili food), a dumpling made from corn meal, banana, semolina or cassava flour, also called Ugali

See also
 Cima (disambiguation)
 Seema (disambiguation)
 Sema (disambiguation)
 Shiba (disambiguation), Japanese pronunciation of family name Sima